The 2022–23 season is the 35th in the history of K.R.C. Genk and their 28th consecutive season in the top flight. The club will participate in the Belgian Pro League and the Belgian Cup.

Players

Out on loan

Other players under contract

Transfers

In

Out

Pre-season and friendlies

Competitions

Overall record

Pro League

League table

Results summary

Results by round

Matches
The league fixtures were announced on 22 June 2022.

Belgian Cup

References

K.R.C. Genk seasons
Genk